The Yamartino method is an algorithm for calculating an approximation of the standard deviation of wind direction during a single pass through the incoming data.

Background
The standard deviation of wind direction is a measure of lateral turbulence and is used in a method for estimating the Pasquill stability category in air pollution dispersion.

The simple method for calculating standard deviation requires two passes through the list of values. The first pass determines the average of those values; the second pass determines the sum of the squares of the differences between the values and the average. This double-pass method requires access to all values. A single-pass method can be used for normal data but is unsuitable for angular data such as wind direction where the 0°/360° (or ±180°) discontinuity forces special consideration. For example, the directions 1°, 0°, and 359° (or −1°) should not average to the direction 180°.

The Yamartino method, introduced by Robert J. Yamartino in 1984, solves both problems. The United States Environmental Protection Agency (EPA) has chosen it as the preferred way to compute the standard deviation of wind direction.
A further discussion of the Yamartino method, along with other methods of estimating the standard deviation of wind direction can be found in Farrugia & Micallef.

It is possible to calculate the exact standard deviation in one pass. However, that method needs slightly more calculation effort.

Algorithm
Over the time interval to be averaged across, n measurements of wind direction (θ) will be made and two totals are accumulated without storage of the n individual values. At the end of the interval the calculations are as follows: with the average values of sin θ and cos θ defined as

Then the average wind direction is given via the four-quadrant arctan(x,y) function as

From twenty different functions for σθ using variables obtained in a single-pass of the wind direction data, Yamartino found the best function to be

 

where

The key here is to remember that sin2θ + cos2θ = 1 so that for example, with a constant wind direction at any value of θ, the value of  will be zero, leading to a zero value for the standard deviation.
 
The use of  alone produces a result close to that produced with a double-pass when the dispersion of angles is small (not crossing the discontinuity), but by construction it is always between 0 and 1.  Taking the arcsine then produces the double-pass answer when there are just two equally common angles: in the extreme case of an oscillating wind blowing backwards and forwards, it produces a result of  radians, i.e. a right angle.  The final factor adjusts this figure upwards so that it produces the double-pass result of  radians for an almost uniform distribution of angles across all directions, while making minimal change to results for small dispersions.

The theoretical maximum error against the correct double-pass σθ is therefore about 15% with an oscillating wind. Comparisons against Monte Carlo generated cases indicate that Yamartino's algorithm is within 2% for more realistic distributions.

A variant might be to weight each wind direction observation by the wind speed at that time.

See also
 Algorithms for calculating variance
 Circular dispersion

References

Further reading

Statistical algorithms
Boundary layer meteorology
Atmospheric dispersion modeling
Directional statistics